Pratiyogita Darpan (Hindi: प्रतियोगिता दर्पण) is an Indian bi-lingual magazine on current affairs and general knowledge specially useful for civil service exams and similar competitive exams.

History and profile
Pratiyogita Darpan was established by Shri Mahendra Jain in 1978. Published by Upkar Prakashan based in Agra, it is a widely read and popular magazine for exams and covers wide areas from current affairs, economy, geography, history, politics and constitution of India. The magazine also has an online version, and is published in English and Hindi languages.

According to Indian Readership Survey (IRS), with an average issue readership (AIR) of 2.154 million, in 2011 Q2, it topped the list of career/ education magazines in India it also had a total readership of 5 million, and was the 3rd largest magazine in India.

References

External links
 Official Website

1978 establishments in Uttar Pradesh
Agra
Education magazines
English-language magazines published in India
Higher education in India
Hindi-language magazines
Monthly magazines published in India
Online magazines published in India
Magazines established in 1978
Student magazines